The , reclassified  from 2019, is a Japanese commuter electric multiple unit (EMU) train type operated by Tokyu Corporation in the Tokyo area since 1992. They were used on Tokyu Den-en-toshi Line and Tokyo Metro Hanzomon Line inter-running services from 1992 until 2018, as well as the Tokyu Oimachi Line since 2018. Three 10-car sets were built by Tokyu Car Corporation between 1992 and 1993, all of which were shortened to 5-car sets by March 2019.

Operations
These sets are used on the Tokyu Oimachi Line. Originally, they were used on Tokyu Den-en-toshi Line and Tokyo Metro Hanzomon Line inter-running services; they were not capable of running through onto the Tobu Skytree Line, and had circular "K" stickers on the centre front cab window to indicate this.

Design
Based on the earlier Tokyu 9000 series EMU design, two sets were introduced in 1992, followed by a third in 1993. The first two sets were delivered with roller blind destination indicators, whereas the third set was delivered from new with 3-colour LED destination indicators. All three sets have since been modified with full-colour LED destination indicators.

Formations

Den-en-toshi Line 10-car sets 
The 10-car sets consisted of six motored (M) cars and four unpowered trailer (T) cars, formed as shown below, with car 1 at the Shibuya end.

Cars 3, 6, and 9 were each fitted with one lozenge type pantograph. Cars 3 and 9 had wheelchair spaces.

Oimachi Line 5-car sets 
The 5-car sets consist of three motored cars and two trailer cars, formed as shown below. Car 1 is at the Oimachi end.

Car 4 is fitted with two single-arm pantographs, and car 2 is fitted with one.

Interior
Passenger accommodation consists of longitudinal bench seating throughout.

History
The first two sets entered service on the Den-en-toshi Line in September 1992, with a third following in 1993.

Oimachi Line transfer and reclassification 
Set 2103 was the first set to be transferred to the Oimachi Line; it was introduced on the line in 2018 as a 5-car formation. By February 2019, 2000 series sets 2102 and 2103 were in service on the Oimachi Line, with set 2102 being shortened to a 5-car formation as well; they were reclassified "9020 series" and respectively numbered 9022 and 9023.

Set 2101 was transferred to the Oimachi Line in March 2019; like the other sets, it was shortened to 5 cars and was renumbered 9021.

Fifteen surplus cars were scrapped in 2018.

References

Electric multiple units of Japan
2000
Train-related introductions in 1992
1500 V DC multiple units of Japan
Tokyu Car multiple units